Dexter is an unincorporated community and census-designated place (CDP) in Calloway County, Kentucky, United States. Its population was 277 as of the 2010 census.

Demographics

Notes

Census-designated places in Calloway County, Kentucky
Census-designated places in Kentucky
Unincorporated communities in Kentucky
Unincorporated communities in Calloway County, Kentucky